Club Deportivo Valdivia is a Chilean professional basketball team located in Valdivia, Chile. The team currently competes in the Liga Nacional de Básquetbol de Chile, where the team won the 2016 and 2019 Championship.

Trophies
 Liga Nacional: 1
2015-16
 Dimayor: 1
2001
 Liga Saesa/Libsur: 3
2011, 2016, 2017

Current roster

Notable players
To appear in this section a player must have either:
- Set a club record or won an individual award as a professional player.
- Played at least one official international match for his senior national team at any time.
 Erik Carrasco
 Sebastian Suarez
 Mario Austin
 Victor Alexander

References

External links
Presentation at Latinbasket.com
Official Facebook account

Videos
CD Valdivia vs ABA Ancud 

Basketball teams in Chile
Basketball teams established in 1986
Valdivia
Sport in Los Ríos Region